Harold Andrews may refer to:
Harold Andrews (footballer, born 1897) (1897–1984), English football forward, for Nelson, Merthyr Town and Exeter City in the 1920s
Harold Andrews (footballer, born 1903) (1903–1988), English football forward, for Lincoln City, Notts County, Barnsley, Luton Town & Accrington Stanley fl. 1920s–1930s
Harold Andrews (politician) (1945–1995), broadcaster and politician in Newfoundland
SS Harold T. Andrews, a Liberty ship 
Harold Marcus Ervine-Andrews (1911–1995), Irish recipient of the Victoria Cross

See also
Harry Andrews (1911–1989), English actor